Elliott Brothers may refer to:

 Elliott Brothers (computer company), an early computer company (1950s–1960s), U.K.
 Elliott Brothers (builders merchant), a builders' merchant, Southampton, U.K.